Having toured Australia the previous winter, W.G. Grace's team landed in England on 18 May 1874 and he was quickly back into domestic cricket.  The 1874 season was very successful for him as he completed a second successive "double".  Gloucestershire again had a strong claim to the Champion County title although some sources have awarded it to Derbyshire and Grace himself said that it should have gone to Yorkshire. Grace made 21 first-class appearances in 1874, scoring 1,664 runs, with a highest score of 179, at an average of 52.00 with 8 centuries and 2 half-centuries. In the field, he held 35 catches and 140 wickets with a best analysis of 7–18. His bowling average was 12.71; he had 5 wickets in an innings 17 times and 10 wickets in a match 9 times.

Another good season followed in 1875 when he again completed the double with 1,498 runs and 191 wickets.  This was his best season as a bowler. Grace made 26 first-class appearances in 1875, scoring 1,498 runs, with a highest score of 152, at an average of 32.56 with 3 centuries and 5 half-centuries. In the field, he held 40 catches and 191 wickets with a best analysis of 9–48. His bowling average was 12.94; he had 5 wickets in an innings 12 times and 10 wickets in a match 8 times.

References

External links
 CricketArchive – W.G. Grace

Bibliography

 
 
 
 
 
 
 
 
 

English cricket seasons in the 19th century
1874